The 2014 Missouri Valley Conference Men's Soccer Tournament was the 24th edition of the tournament. It determined the Missouri Valley Conference's (MVC) automatic berth in the 2014 NCAA Division I Men's Soccer Championship.

The second-seeded SIUE Cougars won the tournament, besting the top-seeded Missouri State Bears in the championship match. It was SIUE's first MVC championship.

Qualification 

The top six teams in the Missouri Valley Conference based on their conference regular season records qualified for the tournament.  The Missouri State Bears, SIUE Cougars, Evansville Purple Aces, Drake Bulldogs, Loyola Chicago Ramblers, and Bradley Braves earned berths in the tournament. Top-seeded Missouri State and second-seeded SIUE received first round byes.

Bracket 
{{6TeamBracket
| RD1         = Quarterfinals
| RD2         = Semifinals
| RD3         = Final

| group1      =
| group2      = 

| seed-width  = 
| team-width  = 
| score-width = 

| RD1-seed1   = 4
| RD1-team1   =Drake
| RD1-score1  = 1
| RD1-seed2  = 5
| RD1-team2   = Loyola 
| RD1-score2  = 3

| RD1-seed3   = 6
| RD1-team3   = Bradley 
| RD1-score3  = 1
| RD1-seed4   =3
| RD1-team4   = Evansville| RD1-score4  = 0

| RD2-seed1   = 1
| RD2-team1   =  Missouri State
| RD2-score1  = 2
| RD2-seed2   = 4
| RD2-team2   = Loyola
| RD2-score2  = 0

| RD2-seed3   = 2
| RD2-team3   = SIUE
| RD2-score3  = 2
| RD2-seed4   = 3
| RD2-team4   = Bradley
| RD2-score4  = 1

| RD3-seed1   = 1
| RD3-team1   = Missouri State
| RD3-score1  = 0
| RD3-seed2   = 3
| RD3-team2   =  SIUE — 2OT
| RD3-score2  = 1
}}

 Schedule 

 Statistical leaders 
 Top goalscorers 

Top goalkeepers

 All-tournament team2014 Missouri Valley Conference Men's Soccer Tournament MVP''— Jabari Danzy, SIUE

See also 
 Missouri Valley Conference
 2014 Missouri Valley Conference men's soccer season
 2014 NCAA Division I men's soccer season
 2014 NCAA Division I Men's Soccer Championship

References 

2014